John McKee Allen (June 4, 1933 – March 3, 2010) was an American football center in the National Football League for the Washington Redskins for four seasons. He was born in Monmouth, Illinois. He played college football at Purdue University and was drafted in the eighth round of the 1955 NFL Draft. He died on March 3, 2010, in Bethesda, Maryland, at the age of 76.

References

1933 births
2010 deaths
American football centers
Purdue Boilermakers football players
Washington Redskins players
People from Monmouth, Illinois
Players of American football from Illinois